Reddyanus basilicus is a species of scorpion in the family Buthidae.

Description
There is high variability in morphometric characters between small males with 27 to 32 mm long after the fourth ecdysis, and larger males 40 to 46 mm long after the fifth ecdysis. Total length is 27 to 46 mm. Male has longer metasomal segments and telson than female. Segments of pedipalps are the same length and width. Pedipalp movable finger is clearly longer than chela manus. Base color reddish. Pedipalps and legs dusted with brown maculation, which is identical on femur and patella as well. First metasomal segment has 10 carinae, whereas second through fourth segments have eight carinae. The fifth segment has five carinae in female but three to five in male. Subaculear tooth is wide and rounded. There are 13 to 18 pectinal teeth.

References

basilicus
Animals described in 1879